The 2015–16 KNVB Cup is the 98th season of the Dutch national football knockout tournament. The winner qualifies for the group stage of the Europa League the following season and the Johan Cruyff Shield, the Dutch Supercup match between the Cup winner and the champions of the Eredivisie.

Qualification
Teams qualified for the Cup through the following: (reserve teams are excluded)

Calendar
The calendar is as follows:

Source: Royal Dutch Football Association

First round
Only amateur teams compete in this round. Matches were played on 26 August 2015. Due to heavy rainfall four matches were abandoned during the game and finished one week later on 2 September 2015

Second round
Winners from the first round compete against all professional clubs.

Third round
The 32 winners from the previous round progress to this stage.

Fourth round
The 16 winners from the previous round progress to this stage.

Quarter-finals
The 8 winners from the previous round progress to this stage.

Semi-finals
The 4 winners from the previous round progress to this stage.

Final

The 2 winners from the previous round progress to the final. The winner of the semi-final match between Feyenoord and AZ is marked as the 'home' team in the final, as that was the first match to be drawn at the draw for the semi-finals.

References

2015-16
2015–16 European domestic association football cups
KNVB